Delaite Island is an island  long, lying  northeast of Emma Island in the north-central portion of Wilhelmina Bay, off the west coast of Graham Land. It was discovered by the Belgian Antarctic Expedition, 1897–99, under Gerlache, and named by him for J. Delaite, a supporter of the expedition.

See also 
 List of Antarctic and sub-Antarctic islands

References

Islands of Graham Land
Danco Coast